Alyse Anderson (born January 13, 1995) is an American mixed martial artist and competes in Atomweight division of ONE Championship. She has also competed in the Invicta Fighting Championships.

Mixed martial arts career

Early career 
Anderson started her amateur career in 2013. After amassing 6–0 record in 2015, She was signed by Total Warrior Combat. where she defeated Chrissie Daniels via TKO in the first round, Rachel Sazoff via unanimous decision and  Tushara Veerella via TKO in round three.

Invicta Fighting Championships 
Anderson made her promotional debut on August 31, 2017, at Invicta FC 25: Kunitskaya vs. Pa'aluhi against Shino VanHoose.  She lost the fight  via split decision.

Her next fight came 11 months later on July 21, 2018, at Invicta FC 30: Frey vs. Grusander against Stephanie Alba.  She won the fight via a submission in round two.

On August 9, 2019, Simpson faced Katie Saull at Invicta FC 36: Sorenson vs. Young. She won the fight via split decision.

ONE Championship
In 2021, Anderson signed with ONE Championship, and was immediately placed in the Atomweight World Grand-Prix. The quarter final bout was initially scheduled take place on May 28, 2021, against Itsuki Hirata at ONE Championship: Empower. However, the event was postponed due to COVID-19. The event was rescheduled for September 3, 2021. She lost the bout via unanimous decision.

Anderson was expected to face Asha Roka at ONE: X on March 26, 2022. However, Anderson later withdrew from the bout due to medical reasons. The fight was rescheduled for ONE 157 on May 20, 2022. Despite getting knocked down, Anderson was able to secure a triangle choke to secure a first-round submission victory.

Anderson is scheduled to face Stamp Fairtex on May 5, 2023, at ONE Fight Night 10.

Personal life 
Anderson is an emergency medical technician in Michigan hospital.

Mixed martial arts record 

|-
| Win
| align=center| 6–2
| Asha Roka
| Submission (triangle choke) 
| ONE 157
| 
| align=center| 1
| align=center| 2:04 
| Kallang, Singapore
| 
|-
| Loss
| align=center| 5–2 
| Itsuki Hirata
| Decision (unanimous)
| ONE Championship: Empower
| 
| align=center| 3
| align=center| 5:00 
| Kallang, Singapore
| 
|-
| Win
| align=center| 5–1
| Katie Saull
| Decision (split)
| Invicta FC 36: Sorenson vs. Young
| 
| align=center| 3
| align=center| 5:00
| Kansas City, Missouri, United States
|
|-
| Win
| align=center| 4–1
| Stephanie Alba
| Technical Submission (triangle choke)
| Invicta FC 30: Frey vs. Grusander 
| 
| align=center| 2
| align=center| 3:12
| Kansas City, Missouri, United States
|
|-
| Loss
| align=center| 3–1
| Shino VanHoose
| Decision (split)
| Invicta FC 25: Kunitskaya vs. Pa'aluhi
| 
| align=center| 3
| align=center| 5:00
| Lemoore, California, United States
|
|-
| Win
| align=center| 3–0
| Tushara Veerella
| TKO (punches)
| TWC Pro Series - Anderson vs. Veerella
| 
| align=center| 3
| align=center|3:49
| Lansing, Michigan, United States
|
|-
| Win
| align=center| 2–0
| Rachel Sazoff
| Decision (unanimous)
| TWC 29
| 
| align=center| 3
| align=center| 5:00
| Lansing, Michigan, United States
|
|-
| Win
| align=center| 1–0
| Chrissie Daniels
| TKO (knees and punches)
| TWC 29
| 
| align=center| 1
| align=center|4:21
| Lansing, Michigan, United States
|
|-

See also 
 List of current ONE fighters
 List of female mixed martial artists

References 

Living people
1995 births
American female mixed martial artists
American practitioners of Brazilian jiu-jitsu
Female Brazilian jiu-jitsu practitioners
Atomweight mixed martial artists
Mixed martial artists utilizing Brazilian jiu-jitsu
21st-century American women